The Great Consolidated Popular Party is a political party in Ghana.

At the last elections, 7 December 2004, the party was part of the Grand Coalition, that won 4 out of 230 seats. Edward Mahama, candidate of the Grand Coalition won 1.9% of the vote in the presidential elections.

The party's founder and first leader, Daniel Augustus Lartey died on 28 December 2009 at the age of 83 years. His eldest son, Henry Herbert Lartey, succeeded him.

Electoral performance

Parliamentary elections

Presidential elections

References

1996 establishments in Ghana
Political parties established in 1996
Political parties in Ghana